Lepidaria is a genus of flowering plants belonging to the family Loranthaceae.

Its native range is Thailand to Western and Central Malesia.

Species:

Lepidaria bicarinata 
Lepidaria biflora 
Lepidaria kingii 
Lepidaria oviceps 
Lepidaria pulchella 
Lepidaria quadriflora 
Lepidaria sabaensis 
Lepidaria tetrantha 
Lepidaria vaginata

References

Loranthaceae
Loranthaceae genera